The Cuban blackbird (Ptiloxena atroviolaceus) is a species of bird in the family Icteridae. It was previously placed in Dives, but now classified in its own genus, the Ptiloxena.

The only non-black body part is the brown eye.

It is endemic to Cuba, where it is widespread and common. It is entirely absent from the Isla de la Juventud and some of the offshore cays.

Its natural habitats are lowland moist forests and heavily degraded former forest.

References

External links

 
 
 
 
 
 

Cuban blackbird
Endemic birds of Cuba
Cuban blackbird
Taxonomy articles created by Polbot
Taxobox binomials not recognized by IUCN